Miles William Lederer (December 30, 1897 – December 25, 1953) was an American politician.

Lederer was born in Philadelphia, Pennsylvania and went to Northeast High School in Philadelphia. He served in the United States Army during World War I. Lederer worked in the office of the Pennsylvania Auditor General as an auditor and an investigator. He was involved with the Democratic Party. Lederer served in the Pennsylvania House of Representatives from 1949 until his death. His sons Raymond and William also served in the Pennsylvania General Assembly. His daughter-in-law Marie also served in the Pennsylvania General Assembly.

Notes

1897 births
1953 deaths
Politicians from Philadelphia
Military personnel from Philadelphia
Democratic Party members of the Pennsylvania House of Representatives
20th-century American politicians